Marie-Louise Fort (3 December 1950 – 24 September 2022) was a French politician who was a member of the National Assembly of France. 

Fort was born in Villeneuve-la-Guyard on 3 December 1950. She represented the 3rd constituency of the Yonne department, as a member of the Union for a Popular Movement.

References

1950 births
2022 deaths
People from Yonne
Rally for the Republic politicians
Union for a Popular Movement politicians
The Popular Right
Women members of the National Assembly (France)
Deputies of the 13th National Assembly of the French Fifth Republic
Deputies of the 14th National Assembly of the French Fifth Republic
21st-century French women politicians